Malkangiri district is the southwesternmost district in the Indian state of Odisha. It has two Vidhan sabha constituencies.

History 
Local legend claims Valmiki wrote the Ramayana on the banks of the Tamasa river. The region was known as Malyavantagiri in the Ramayana, and it was believed Sitakunda was the bathing-place of Sita, near Mudulipada. Local legend claims the Pandavas spent a year in exile in the dense forests of Malkangiri. Kanamraju, Balaraju and Poturaju are the three famous Lords of this area, who are being worshiped by the people. On every alternative year, Badayatra, the festival of these Lords is celebrated throughout the district.

Prior to 1936, Malkangiri was a part of Koraput district of the Madras Presidency. In 1936, Koraput District was merged into Odisha and Malkangiri Tahasil was included in Koraput District. This Tahasil was a part of Nawarangpur sub-division of Koraput District. On 1 January 1962, Malkangiri subdivision was carved out. In 1958, refugees from East Pakistan were settled in the area in the Dandakaranya Project. This project continued for 30 years until it was declared closed in the year 1988.

Finally on 2 October 1992, Malkangiri was carved out of Koraput District. Today, the district has become known as a hotbed for Maoist activities.

Administrative setup 
There are 07 Blocks and 07 Tahasils under one Sub-Division in Malkangiri district are listed in the following table.

There are 12 Police Stations under two Police Sub-Divisions in Malkangiri district are listed in the following table.

Economy
In 2006 the Ministry of Panchayati Raj named Malkangiri one of the country's 250 most backward districts (out of a total of 640). It is one of the 19 districts in Odisha currently receiving funds from the Backward Regions Grant Fund Programme (BRGF).

Demographics

According to the 2011 census Malkangiri district has a population of 613,192, roughly equal to the nation of Solomon Islands or the US state of Vermont. This gives it a ranking of 523rd in India (out of a total of 640).
Its population growth rate over the decade 2001-2011 was  21.53%. Malkangiri has a sex ratio of 1016 females for every 1000 males, and a literacy rate of 49.49%. Scheduled Castes and Scheduled Tribes make up 22.55% and 57.83% of the population respectively.

At the time of the 2011 Census of India, 34.06% of the population in the district spoke Odia, 23.40% Koya, 21.48% Bengali, 4.18% Desia, 2.97% Telugu, 2.59% Kuvi, 1.99% Bhuiyan, 1.72% Proja and 1.36% Halbi as their first language. There are several other languages spoken in the district including Remo and Gta', this last language spoken by the Didayi people. The Bengali language is prevalent and spoken mostly by descendants of refugees from Bangladesh erst while East Pakistan. The Odia Language is the dominant language with its dialects  Desia and  Paraja.

Politics

Vidhan sabha constituencies

Malkangiri has 2 Vidhan Sabha constituencies, electing members to the Odisha Legislative Assembly:

References

External links
 

 
1992 establishments in Orissa
Districts of Odisha